The 2005 Turkish Cup Final was a football match played on 11 May 2005 at the Atatürk Olympic Stadium in Istanbul. It was the final and deciding match of the 2004–05 Türkiye Kupası (Turkish Cup).

Match details

References
 2005 Turkish Cup Final 
 2004–05 Turkish Cup 

2005
Turkish Cup Final  2005
Türkiye Kupası Final 2005
Turkish Cup 2005